The Independent Socialist Party of Chad (PSIT) was a political party in Chad.

History
The party emerged from a split of the Independent Socialist Party of Chad in 1955. The new version of PSIT was constituted at a General Assembly held on 27 March 1955. The Assembly adopted statues for the party and a politburo was constituted, with Ahmed Kotoko as general secretary, Chérif Hamid Mahamat as chairman and Mahamat Yakouma and Ali Kamara as vice chairmen. 

The new PSIT joined the Entente coalition for the 1957 Territorial Assembly elections. The Entente won 57 of the 65 seats, with PSIT taking a single seat.

References

1955 establishments in Chad
Defunct political parties in Chad
Political parties established in 1955
Socialist parties in Chad